Ceratistes may refer to:
 a synonym for Eriosyce,  plant genus
 Ceratistes (beetle), a genus of beetle in the subfamily Malachiinae